Phyllogomphus is a genus of dragonflies in the family Gomphidae. It contains the following species:
Phyllogomphus aethiops 
Phyllogomphus annulus 
Phyllogomphus bartolozzii 
Phyllogomphus coloratus 
Phyllogomphus moundi 
Phyllogomphus occidentalis 
Phyllogomphus pseudoccidentalis 
Phyllogomphus schoutedeni 
Phyllogomphus selysi  – southern leaftail

References

Gomphidae
Anisoptera genera
Taxa named by Edmond de Sélys Longchamps
Taxonomy articles created by Polbot